Bless the Woman is a Russian film that was released in 2003. The film is based on the novel Hostess, by Irina Grekova.

Plot
The film begins in a small seaside village in the early 30s. A young girl falls in love with an older visiting military officer named Larichev and goes with him to his place of service. Following always and everywhere for her beloved husband (Central Asia, the North, the Soviet-Finnish War, the beginning of the Great Patriotic War), the heroine fully sacrifices herself to him, obeying his orders without discussion. Captivity, suspicion and the ruin of his military career (dismissal from the army) break Larichev's strong character, bringing death from heart failure. The heroine's life without him is a new beginning.

Cast
 Svetlana Khodchenkova as Vera
 Aleksandr Baluev as Larichev
Olga  Beryozkina as Masha
 Aleksandr Mikhailov  as Yurlov
Alexandra Kosteniuk as Vera (Masha's daughter)
Irina Kupchenko as Anna Stepanovna
Vitaly Khaev as Ryabinin
 Inna Churikova as Kunina
Stanislav Govorukhin as Divisional Commander
 Anatoliy Kotenyov as colonel 
 Maksim Galkin  as actor
 Nina Maslova  as doctor

Awards and nominations
Nominations for Nika Award for Best Feature Film and Best Actress (Svetlana Khodchenkova) (2004).
Nika Award for Best Supporting Actress (Inna Churikova) (2004).
Pacific Meridian for People's Choice Award (2003).

References

External links
 
 Энциклопедия отечественного кино

Films directed by Stanislav Govorukhin
2003 romantic drama films
2003 films
Mosfilm films
Russian romantic drama films
Russian World War II films
2000s Russian-language films
Films based on Russian novels
Russian historical drama films